Sidney Jones may refer to:

Sidney Jones (American football), American football player
Sidney Jones (cricketer), Australian cricket player
Sidney Jones (composer), English musical theatre composer.
Sidney L. Jones, American economist
Sidney Jones, South East Asia programme director of International Crisis Group
USS Sidney C. Jones, a 19th-century American navy ship

See also
Sydney Jones, New Zealand politician
Sir Sydney Jones (businessman), British shipowner and politician